Since a certain time until 1991 in the end of each year the Federation of Sports Journalists of the USSR held an inquest among its members to name top ten athletes of the year of the USSR. Here is a list of them.

List

1971

Vasily Alexeyev (Athlete of the Year)
Yevgeniy Arzhanov
Valeriy Borzov
Alexander Medved
Faina Melnik
Boris Onishchenko
Lyudmila Pakhomova and Alexander Gorshkov
Irina Rodnina and Aleksei Ulanov
Nina Statkevich
Ludmilla Tourischeva

1972
Alphabetical order.
Mykola Avilov
Vasily Alexeyev
Valeriy Borzov
Lyudmila Bragina
Olga Korbut
Galina Kulakova
Alexander Medved
Viktor Saneyev
Ludmilla Tourischeva
Vyacheslav Vedenin

1973
Irina Rodnina (Athlete of the Year)
Ludmilla Tourischeva
Faina Melnik
Galina Shugurova
Nadezhda Chizhova
Valeri Kharlamov
Pavel Pervushin (weightlifting)
Levan Tediashvili
Pavel Lednev
Anatoly Karpov

1975
Tatyana Averina
Sergei Belov
Oleg Blokhin
Irina Kalinina
Anatoly Karpov
Yevgeny Kulikov
Pavel Lednev
Zebinisso Rustamova
Ludmilla Tourischeva
Alexander Yakushev

1979
Ordered by number of points:

Boris Mikhailov (Athlete of the Year)
Vladimir Salnikov
Yurik Vardanyan
Anatoly Karpov
Alexander Dityatin
Natalya Linichuk and Gennadi Karponossov
Sergei Sukhoruchenkov
Lyudmila Kondratyeva
Galina Kulakova
Nellie Kim

1983

Tamara Bykova (Athlete of the Year)
Dmitry Bilozerchev
Vladimir Salnikov
Garry Kasparov
Natalia Yurchenko
Yurik Vardanyan
Vladislav Tretyak
Anatoly Starostin
Fyodor Cherenkov
Sergei Litvinov

1984
Announced on December 28, 1984.
Sergey Bubka (Athlete of the Year)
Yurik Vardanyan
Yuri Sedykh
Oleg Bozhev
Anatoly Beloglazov (wrestling)
Sergei Zabolotnov
Nikolay Zimyatov
Elena Valova and Oleg Vasiliev
Sergei Kopylov
Olga Mostepanova

1986
Announced on December 27, 1986.
Sergey Bubka (Athlete of the Year)
Igor Belanov
Igor Zhelezovski
Yury Zakharevich
Garry Kasparov
Igor Polyansky
Arvydas Sabonis
Yuri Sedykh
Marina Stepanova
Andrei Chesnokov

1988
Ordered by number of points:
Vladimir Salnikov (Athlete of the Year)
Sergey Bubka
Arvydas Sabonis
Vladimir Artemov
Yuri Zakharevich
Yelena Shushunova
Alexei Mikhailichenko
Tatyana Samolenko-Dorovskikh
Tamara Tikhonova
Gintautas Umaras

1989
Ordered by number of points:
Garry Kasparov (Athlete of the Year)
Elena Välbe
Fyodor Cherenkov
Igor Korobchinsky
Svetlana Boguinskaya
Radion Gataullin
Alexandra Timoshenko
Igor Zhelezovski
Israel Akopkokhyan (boxing)
Alexander Karelin

1990
Ordered by number of points:
Garry Kasparov (Athlete of the Year)
Elena Välbe
Andrei Cherkasov
Sergei Yuran
Anatoly Khrapaty
Jüri Jaanson
Radion Gataullin
Alexander Karelin
Svetlana Boginskaya
Andrey Kurnyavka (boxing)

References

Further reading
Evelyn Mertin, Presenting Heroes. Athletes as Role Models for the New Soviet Person. In: The International Journal of the History of Sport 26(3)(Regional Issue: Europe, Regional Academic Editor: Thierry Terret), 2009, pp. 469–483.

Sports trophies and awards
Soviet awards